Henry Boyd may refer to:

 Henry Boyd (footballer) (1868–1913), Scottish footballer
 Henry Boyd (academic) (1831–1922), British clergyman and academic administrator at the University of Oxford
 Henry Boyd (translator) (died 1832), Irish translator of Dante

See also
 Henry Boyd-Carpenter (born 1939), English solicitor